The Nissan 1400 is a flatbed truck, which was manufactured from 1971 to 2008 in South Africa under changing designations. Its successor is the Nissan NP200. It was manufactured by Rosslyn Motor Assemblers, which later became Nissan South Africa.

Model history 
The vehicle with the internal designation B120 was sold worldwide in 1971 as Datsun 1200 and was based on the Model B110. It had a payload of more than half a ton.

In 1976, the Datsun 1200 was renamed 120 Y. At the same time, production started in South Africa.

The model bore the internal designation B121 from 1979 onwards and B122 from 1981, while the larger engined variant available only in South Africa was given the number B140. The B120 was sold in Australia until 1985 and produced in Japan until 1994.

The model in South Africa received a 1.4-liter engine (code A14) in 1980 (or 1984) and was renamed to Datsun 1400 and 1982 respectively to Nissan 1400.

In 1985, the Nissan 1400 received a 75 mm higher cab roof and front disc brakes. At about the same time, local (South African) parts content had reached 100 percent. 

The facelift also included the conversion to rectangular headlights and black instead of chrome bumper. 

A sport model of the 1400 Bakkie was marketed as the Champ. This model had appropriate side striping, bucket seats, a tachometer, a trip odometer, and central handbrake. This vehicle had two popular local nicknames, either 1400 or kanniedood which, translated from Afrikaans, means "cannot die", a testament to its reliability. The 1400 Bakkie was assembled by Nissan in Rosslyn, South Africa (Nissan). Another assembly location for the model was the Aymesa plant in Quito, Ecuador which assembled it under the Datsun brand name as the 1200 PickUp.

Further facelifts took place in 2002 and 2005. Later models of the Nissan 1400 had a five-speed gearbox. Essential technical aspects such as engine with carburetor, leaf springs and rear-wheel drive remained unchanged throughout the construction period.

The Nissan 1400 was regarded as a reference of this class in South Africa and was also nicknamed "Champion of Africa". The production, which was discontinued due to stricter emission and safety regulations, ended with 150 copies of the Heritage Edition.

References

External links

1400
Cars of South Africa
Rear-wheel-drive vehicles
Pickup trucks
1980s cars
1990s cars
2000s cars
Cars introduced in 1971